Patrik Luža (born 27 July 1994) is a Slovak professional ice hockey defenceman for HC '05 Banská Bystrica of the Slovak Extraliga. 

Luža previously played in the Slovak Extraliga for HC Slovan Bratislava, HK 36 Skalica, HK Dukla Michalovce, MHk 32 Liptovský Mikuláš, MsHK Žilina and HK Dukla Trenčín. He also played for Slovan Bratislava while they were members of the Kontinental Hockey League, playing 81 games in the KHL and scoring three goals and four assists.

On 27 July 2019 Luža signed for TH Unia Oświęcim of the Polska Hokej Liga.

Career statistics

Regular season and playoffs

International

References

External links
 

1994 births
Living people
HC '05 Banská Bystrica players
HK Dukla Trenčín players
AZ Havířov players
MHk 32 Liptovský Mikuláš players
Ritten Sport players
HK 36 Skalica players
Slovak ice hockey defencemen
HC Slovan Bratislava players
Ice hockey people from Bratislava
TH Unia Oświęcim players
MsHK Žilina players
HK Dukla Michalovce players
Slovak expatriate ice hockey players in the Czech Republic
Expatriate ice hockey players in Italy
Expatriate ice hockey players in Poland
Slovak expatriate sportspeople in Poland
Slovak expatriate sportspeople in Italy